{{Infobox games
| name          = XXI Asian Games
| logo          = Doha 2030 Asian Games bid logo.svg
| size          = 150px
| caption       =
| motto         = Your Gateway()
| host_city     = Doha, Qatar
| nations       = 
| athletes      = 
| events        = 
| opening       = 
| closing       = 
| opened_by     = 
| athlete_oath  = 
| judge_oath    = 
| torch_lighter = 
| stadium       = Khalifa International Stadium
| website       = agdoha2030.qa
| previous      = Aichi-Nagoya 2026
| next          = Riyadh 2034 
}}
The 2030 Asian Games, officially known as the XXI Asiad and commonly known as Doha 2030, will be the twenty-first edition of the Asian Games, a pan-Asian multi-sport event that, to be held in Doha, Qatar.

Doha was elected as the host city at the 39th OCA General Assembly on 16 December 2020 in Muscat, Oman. These Games will be the second Asian Games to be held in Qatar, the second in Arabian Peninsula, the first of two consecutive Asian Games in Arabian Peninsula, the following Games set to be the 2034 Asian Games in Riyadh, Saudi Arabia. Doha will be the fourth city to host the Asian Games twice, having previously hosted the 2006 Asian Games and will use again much of the infrastructure that was built for this event and also for the 2022 FIFA World Cup will be reused.

Bidding process

The OCA voted on 16 December 2020 at the 39th OCA General Assembly in Muscat, Oman to select the host city. On 15 December 2020, OCA President Sheikh Ahmad Al-Fahad Al-Sabah announced that he would attempt to find a dual-host city solution to avoid a vote for the 2030 Asian Games, by persuading one city to host the event in 2030 and the other to organize the competition in 2034. On 16 December 2020, it was announced that Doha will host 2030 Games with the highest votes and Riyadh will host the 2034 Games. Saudi Arabia had asked the OCA to halt electronic voting on the host of the 2030 Asian Games due to "the possibility of technical fraud".

Venues

Qatar Foundation Campus
Qatar Foundation Stadium – football (preliminaries) / 20,000 existing
Qatar Foundation Golf Course – golf / 1,000 existing
Al Shaqab Equestrian Center – equestrian, modern pentathlon / 5,000 existing
Qatar Foundation Recreation Centre – modern pentathlon / 6,000 (in total) existing
Qatar National Convention Centre – cue sports (billiards), esports / 1,000 existing

Al Rayyan Sports Complex
Indoor Hall – judo, kurash, wrestling / 3,000 existing
Al Rayyan Baseball and Softball Centre – baseball, softball / 1,500 temporary
Al Rayyan Hockey Centre – field hockey  / 2,000 temporary
Al Rayyan Stadium – football (preliminaries) / 15,300 existing

Lusail
Lusail Arena – handball / 15,300 existing
Lusail Shooting Range – shooting / 1,600 existing
Lusail Archery Range – archery / 600 existing
Lusail Marina – athletics (street events), cycling (road time trial), marathon swimming, triathlon / 500 temporary
Canal – canoeing, rowing / 500 temporary
Katara Cultural Village Marina – sailing / N/A temporary

Al Gharrafa Sports Complex
Al Gharaffa Indoor Hall – sepak takraw / 3,000 existing
Al Gharrafa Stadium – rugby sevens  / 21,000 existing
Al Gharaffa Beach Handball Arenas – beach handball / 2,200 existing
Al Gharaffa Beach Soccer Arenas – beach Soccer / 1,300 existing
Al Gharaffa Beach Volleyball Arenas – beach volleyball / 1,300 existing

Al Sadd Sports Complex
Ali Bin Hamad Al Attiyah Arena
basketball / 7,000 existing
3x3 basketball / 3,000 temporary
Al Sadd Swimming Pool – water polo (preliminaries)/ 1,000 existing

Aspire Zone
Squash Courts – squash / 1,000 (main court) existing
Tennis Courts – soft tennis, tennis / 7,855 (main court) existing
Padel Courts – padel / 1,500 (main court) existing
Al Dana Indoor Hall – weightlifting / 1,000 existing
Al Dana Banquet Hall – chess / 500 (main competition) existing
Aspire Dome 
cycling (track) / 1,500 temporary
gymnastics / 4,900 existing
badminton, wushu / 600 existing
kabaddi, karate, taekwondo / 1,000 existing
boxing / 600 existing
Hamad Aquatic Centre – artistic swimming, diving, swimming / 2,500 existing
Khalifa International Stadium – athletics (track and field), opening and closing ceremonies / 45,000 existing
Skateboarding Park – skateboarding / 500 existing
Sports Climbing Park – sports climbing / 1,000 existing
Basketball Hall – basketball, fencing / 2,000 existing

Stand-alone venues
Al Thumama Stadium – football (preliminaries) / 20,000 existing
Doha Asian Town Stadium – cricket / 13,000 existing
Al Janoub Stadium – football (preliminaries) / 20,000 existing
Al Bayt Stadium – football (preliminaries) / 20,000 existing
Duhail Indoor Arena – volleyball / 5,500 existing
Al Bidda Park – beach volleyball / 350'' existing

References

External links
 Doha 2030 official website

 
Asian Games
Asian Games
Asian Games by year
Asian Games 2030
International sports competitions hosted by Qatar
Sport in Doha
2030 in sports